Jean Courtois may refer to:

 Jean Courtois (herald) (died 1436), French herald
 Jean Courtois (composer) (fl. 1530–1545), Franco-Flemish composer
 Jean-Pierre Courtois (17th century), French painter and father of painters Jacques, Guillaume and Jean-François Courtois
 Jean-Patrick Courtois (born 1951), member of the Senate of France
 Jean-Philippe Courtois, president of Microsoft International

See also
 Courtois (disambiguation)